This is a list of governors of Vargas in Venezuela. The state was created in 1998, the territory having previously been part of the Federal District.

List of governors
Vargas' bid for statehood was approved in 1998.

Notes

References 

 Cuadro Comparativo Gobernadores Electos por Entidad Elecciones 1989-1992-1995-1998-2000.
 CNE: Elecciones Regionales del 2004.
 CNE: Elecciones Regionales del 2008
 CNE: Elecciones Regionales del 2012
 CNE: Elecciones Regionales del 2017
 Venezuela vote dispute escalates foreign sanctions threat (2017)

Vargas
Vargas